Terry Leabeater is an Australian former rugby league footballer who played as a  for Western Suburbs, Canterbury-Bankstown and the Parramatta Eels in the 1970s and 1980s.

Playing career
Leabeater made his first grade debut for Western Suburbs against St. George in Round 18 1979 at Lidcombe Oval.

Leabeater's first spell at Wests ended in 1982 after the club lost in the finals series against Eastern Suburbs.

Leabeater then signed with Canterbury-Bankstown but only made 4 first grade appearances for the club and then returned to Western Suburbs in 1985 who finished second last.  In 1986, Leabeater signed with Parramatta.  He was a member of Parramatta's 1986 premiership winning team which defeated Canterbury 4-2 at the Sydney Cricket Ground.  As of the 2020 season, this is the club's last premiership victory.

Leabeater's last game in the top grade ironically came against his old club Wests in Round 22 1988 which Parramatta won 16-12 at Parramatta Stadium.

Post playing
In 2014, Leabeater's leagues club membership was canceled by Parramatta for five years and an AVO was filed against him by former teammate Steve Sharp and deputy Parramatta chairman Tony Issa.  Leabeater is alleged to have threatened the pair numerous times in relation to  boardroom elections at the club.

References

1958 births
Living people
Australian rugby league players
Canterbury-Bankstown Bulldogs players
Parramatta Eels players
Rugby league players from Sydney
Rugby league props
Western Suburbs Magpies players